Emma Trentini (1878-March 23, 1959) was an Italian soprano opera singer who came to the United States in December 1906.

Early life
She was from Mantova, Italy (Mantua). Her parents were poor and could not afford to give her money to attain an operatic career. At the age of 12 she was welcomed into the church choir of Mantova. A fund was raised and her mother consented to allow her to go away and study with the renowned Lombardi. She obtained a place at the Teatro alla Scala in Milan at the age of 14. She studied there for four years and toured Europe as a performer between seasons. During her travels she met Dame Nellie Melba, the Australian soprano opera singer. Melba the Great recommended Trentini to Oscar Hammerstein who was in Paris and searching throughout Europe for new talent. Trentini sang for Hammerstein in Brussels, Belgium. He was impressed by her and she was extended a five-year contract.

Grand opera singer
She performed as a singer with Hammerstein at the Manhattan Opera House. The opera house was built by Hammerstein and opened in 1906. It still stands at 34th Street (Manhattan). When she came to America she spoke only Italian. Trentini studied English diligently, repeating words and phrases over and over. One difficulty for her was that she sometimes attached an incorrect meaning to a word. An example of this was when she thanked a member of the opera house staff for a favor and uttered Kiss Me instead of Thank You. She said the words again and again until a linguist corrected her. At that point she fled the room, returning to her hotel to say Thank You repeatedly!

In February 1907 Trentini wore the clothing of an old woman in a production of the comedy opera Il Barbiere di Seviglia by
Gioachino Rossini. In March she appeared in her first true role in America, performing the part of Musetta. The Manhattan
Opera audience was both amused and pleased by her rendition of the La Boheme character.

The same month she became ill for several weeks after going on stage with Melba and Mademoiselle Calve', against the advice of her physician. Trentini made her return in Carmen, which she entered during the second act on April 17. She played one of the women smugglers. Although the part was a small one, she woke up the next morning with all of New York talking about her.

Trentini continued to play minor roles but her piquant personality made them seem more significant. She made her way on stage in a routine fashion each time, with a smile and a twinkle in her eyes. She approached the kitchen chair in the first entrance at the
Manhattan Opera, where the impresario and Board of Directors were seated. At first she used to request a quarter from Hammerstein, but as time went on, he offered it unsolicited. He placed it in the bodice of Trentini's dress. She never performed without it being there. She sang at the Manhattan for four years and piled each silver piece with the others in her room.

During her second season at the Manhattan she was drafted to perform the part of Antonia in Les contes d'Hoffmann. She did
not know the French (language) but volunteered to learn the role. The following summer she resided in a house in the south of
France and perfected her French until she was fluent.

Claude Debussy heard her sing Yniold in Pelléas et Mélisande at Covent Garden in London, England. He was enthusiastic and inscribed a photo to mon toute petite Yniold. He also heard her sing in Proseperine by Camille Saint-Saëns.

Among her more noteworthy roles are performances as Violetta, Nedda in Pagliacci, and Gilda. She appeared in many Italian cities and
Cairo. Under Hammerstein's management she sang roles in Bal Masque, Louise, The Tales of Hoffmann, Thais, and "Pelléas et
Mélisande".

In The Tales of Hoffmann she played three characters by an odd turn of events. Trentini was depicting two people
when the soprano Cavalieri became ill and could not make an evening performance. Hammerstein phoned Trentini and told her the situation. She asked that Cavalieri's part be sent to her. Within one hour of rehearsing she became letter perfect and she sang three roles that night.

Comic opera
The New York Times interviewed her in September 1910 at her West 10th Street apartment. She was in the company of Victor Herbert, with whom she was preparing the music of a new part. Hammerstein wanted to change her from a grand opera singer to comic opera vocalist.
When he suggested this she confessed to the writer that she cried for two days. Others followed Hammerstein's lead in wanting Trentini to make the transition. She reconsidered, exclaiming that it would be very nice to be the etoile-une toute petite etoile. In English she meant she believed she could excel as a singular star of comic opera rather than one of many in grand opera.

The English language continued to be a problem for her, though she took eighty lessons in a single season the previous winter. The
difficulty was more pronounced in comic opera which lacked the music to assist a performer. Trentini had never spoken lines at this
point in her opera career. Herbert's comic opera, Naughty Marietta (1910), was set in New Orleans in 1750. In the second act Trentini was
given an opportunity to portray a boy. The opera was adapted from a book by Rita Johnson Young.

The debut of Naughty Marietta was at the Bowery Theatre on November 7, 1910. Trentini and Orville Harrold appeared in 136 performances before the production was taken on the road. A dispute between Herbert and Trentini arose when Herbert requested that Trentini perform an encore of the Street Song. Trentini ignored him because she wished to save her voice for the rest of the performance.

The feud between Herbert and Trentini gave composer Rudolf Friml his first big opportunity. Herbert refused to work with Trentini
so Friml joined with Otto Harbach to compose The Firefly (1912) for Trentini. Friml said of Trentini in September 1970: Smartest singer I ever met. She never talked or sang out loud and when she did it was always one octave lower. She saved her full voice for a real audience.

Private life
Opera tenor Enrico Caruso wooed Trentini for sixteen months after which she vowed to marry him in 1911. A portion of
their courtship occurred in Rimini. Later, Trentini was named as a co-respondent in Friml's divorce from his first wife in 1915, and evidence was introduced that they were having an affair.

Emma Trentini died in 1959.

References

External links

Emma Trentini News Service photo from 1900

1878 births
1959 deaths
Italian operatic sopranos
19th-century Italian actresses
Italian stage actresses
Italian musical theatre actresses
Italian voice actresses
American operatic sopranos
Vaudeville performers
Italian emigrants to the United States
Musicians from Mantua
Actors from Mantua